The progressive present is a grammatical tense that is used only if an action is actually in progress at the time. For example, in Spanish, "estoy leyendo" means "I am reading (right now)." It is formed by using the present indicative of estar plus the present participle of the verb.

See also
Progressive past

Grammatical tenses